"808" is a song by Chinese singer and songwriter Jane Zhang. It was released on November 21, 2017.

Live performances
In November 2017, Jane Zhang performed "808" at the Victoria's Secret Fashion Show in Shanghai, China, along with "Dust My Shoulders Off" and "Work For It".

Chart performance
"808" debuted at number 39 on the US Billboard Hot Dance/Electronic Songs  chart.

For the week of January 3, 2018, "808" re-entered the US Billboard Hot Dance/Electronic Songs at number 31.

Track listing

Charts

Release history

References

2017 songs
Jane Zhang songs
Songs written by Jane Zhang